Novine, is a Croatian drama series that has been broadcast on Hrvatska Radiotelevizija since 2016.

The screenplay for it was written by Ivica Đikić, a journalist who had served as editor-in-chief of Rijeka's Novi list several years earlier.

The story takes place in Rijeka, that describes the life and work of a journalist and editor of a fictitious Novine, which is considered to be the last independent and "serious" newspaper in Croatia, that is the temptation that leads to them being taken over by the "raw" but power-bound construction tycoon, whose character is interpreted by Aleksandar Cvjetković. The series, which was also mostly filmed in Rijeka, was directed by Dalibor Matanić. Critics have noted the strong influence of the so-called nordic noir television thrillers, as well as the popular American TV series The Wire, which pays tribute to numerous details.

Novine had its Zagreb premiere on October 13, 2016, at Cinestar in Branimir Center.

The series is also interesting for its location, the city of Rijeka, which very rarely appeared as a scene in Croatian films and series. On 3 April 2018, it is announced that it has become the first Croatian-language drama series to be aired on Netflix, the largest and most important program streaming platform in the world. This will make the series available in more than 130 countries worldwide and is a major leap into the US and global markets. This is the largest single export of one Croatian audiovisual product in Croatian history. The offer had already arrived from Channel 4, but the distributor had planned a bigger stake and succeeded. It is marketed to nearly half a billion viewers. It is also the second series in a Slavic language to succeed, after the Russian Silver Spoon.

Plot
Marijo Kardum (Aleksandar Cvjetković), an influential construction tycoon, is suddenly in a hurry to take over the Novine because young journalist Andrej Marinković (Goran Marković) has begun investigating a mysterious car accident with which the future owner is closely linked. The sudden change of ownership is also triggered by internal turmoil in the newsroom, driven by a desire for power, vanity and ambition. At the heart of these turmoil are veteran journalists Dijana Mitrović (Branka Katić), Nikola Martić (Trpimir Jurkić), Martin Vidov (Zijad Gračić) and Alenka Jović-Marinković (Olga Pakalović), who are replaced by editor-in-chief.

Cast

Main cast

Supporting cast

Production
The filming of a second season began in 2018, and episodes began airing in September 2018. The final season of HRT's Novine series begins airing in early March.

References

External links
 

2010s Croatian television series
2020s Croatian television series
2016 Croatian television series debuts
Croatian television series
Television series about journalism
Croatian Radiotelevision original programming